DVHS may refer to:

 D-VHS, digital video system
 Del Valle High School (El Paso, Texas)
 Del Valle High School (Travis County, Texas)
 Deer Valley High School (Glendale, Arizona)
 Delaware Valley High School (public school)
 Delaware Valley High School (private school)
 Desert Vista High School
 Dougherty Valley High School
 Leonardo da Vinci High School